"Videotheque" is a song by British pop duo Dollar. It appeared on the album The Dollar Album. The song spent 10 weeks on the UK charts, peaking at #17. It also reached the same chart position in Ireland.

A demo version by producer Trevor Horn when he was part of The Buggles featuring keyboardist/guitarist Simon Darlow with Horn on vocals is included on the 2010 reissue of Adventures in Modern Recording.

Chart history

References 

Dollar (band) songs
The Buggles songs
1982 songs
1982 singles
Songs written by Trevor Horn
Songs written by Simon Darlow